Bede's Death Song is the editorial name given to a five-line Old English poem, supposedly the final words of the Venerable Bede. It is, by far, the Old English poem that survives in the largest number of manuscripts — 35 or 45 (mostly later medieval manuscripts copied on the Continent). It is found in both Northumbrian and West Saxon dialects.

Attribution to Bede
Bede died on Thursday, 26 May 735 (Ascension Day) on the floor of his cell, singing Glory be to the Father and to the Son and to the Holy Spirit and was buried at Jarrow. Cuthbert, a disciple of Bede's, wrote a letter to a Cuthwin (of whom nothing else is known), describing Bede's last days and his death.  According to Cuthbert, Bede fell ill, "with frequent attacks of breathlessness but almost without pain", before Easter.  On the Tuesday, two days before Bede died, his breathing became worse and his feet swelled.  He continued to dictate to a scribe, however, and despite spending the night awake in prayer he dictated again the following day.  At three o'clock, according to Cuthbert, he asked for a box of his to be brought, and  distributed among the priests of the monastery "a few treasures" of his: "some pepper, and napkins, and some incense". That night he dictated a final sentence to the scribe, a boy named Wilberht, and died soon afterwards. Cuthbert's letter also relates a five-line poem in the vernacular that Bede composed on his deathbed, known as "Bede's Death Song". But the poem's attribution to Bede is not absolutely certain—not all manuscripts name Bede as the author, and the ones that do are of later origin than those that do not.

Text
Recorded in both Northumbrian and West Saxon, as edited in the Anglo-Saxon Poetic Records series (with ‖ representing a medial caesura) the poem reads:

Northumbrian version

West Saxon version

Modern English translation
Literally:
  Before the necessary journey, no-one will be wiser in thought than he needs to be, to think, before he goes from here, about what of his spirit, of good or of evil, will be judged after his death-day.

In a literal translation by Leo Shirley-Price, the text reads as:

Before setting forth on that inevitable journey, none is wiser than the man who considers—before his soul departs hence—what good or evil he has done, and what judgement his soul will receive after its passing.

In a verse translation by Brice Stratford, it reads:

Modern Northumbrian translation
A translation into the modern Northumbrian dialect by Richard Oliver Heslop.

Notes

References

Sources
 
 

Bede
Old English poetry
Old English literature